Go Ah-ra (born 21 September 1992) is a Korean badminton player, specializing in doubles play. Go won 2013 Vietnam Open Grand Prix with her partner Yoo Hae-won, she and Yoo also won the bronze medal at the 2013 Badminton Asia Championships. In 2016, she won the silver medal at the 2016 Uber Cup with Korean women's badminton team.

Achievements

Asian Championships 
Women's doubles

Summer Universiade 
Women's doubles

Mixed doubles

BWF Grand Prix (1 title, 1 runner-up) 
The BWF Grand Prix had two levels, the BWF Grand Prix and Grand Prix Gold. It was a series of badminton tournaments sanctioned by the Badminton World Federation (BWF) which was held from 2007 to 2017.

Women's doubles

  BWF Grand Prix Gold tournament
  BWF Grand Prix tournament

BWF International Challenge/Series (1 title, 1 runner-up) 
Women's doubles

  BWF International Challenge tournament
  BWF International Series tournament

References

External links 
 

1992 births
Living people
Sportspeople from South Jeolla Province
South Korean female badminton players
Badminton players at the 2014 Asian Games
Asian Games silver medalists for South Korea
Asian Games medalists in badminton
Medalists at the 2014 Asian Games
Universiade medalists in badminton
Universiade gold medalists for South Korea
Universiade bronze medalists for South Korea
Medalists at the 2015 Summer Universiade